Government Post Graduate College Lakki Marwat is public sector degree college located in Lakki Marwat town of Khyber Pakhtunkhwa in Pakistan. The college offers programs for intermediate level both in Arts and Science groups plus it also offers courses in 4 years BS degrees and 2 years Master degree courses in Statistics, Islamiyat and Computer Science for which it is affiliated with University of Science and Technology Bannu.

Overview and history 
Government Post Graduate College Lakki Marwat is one of the oldest colleges in Khyber Pakhtunkhwa. It was established in 1963 and initially started as Intermediate level college. It was upgraded to degree level in 1973. The college was moved to its current campus in 1994. It becomes Postgraduate degree college in 2003 and started Master level courses in Islamiyat, Computer Science and Statistics. In 2010-2011, the college started 4 years BS programs in Chemistry, Political Science and Physics.

In September 2014, the Government of Khyber Pakhtunkhwa has created sub campus of University of Science and Technology Bannu in the college. The campus is currently offering research in 2 disciplines: Education & Research (IER) and Political Science.

Departments and faculties 
The college has the following departments and faculties.

Faculty of Social Sciences 
 Department of Economics
 Department of English Language & Literature
 Department of Geography
 Department of Health and Physical Education
 Department of History
 Department of Islamiat
 Department of Pak Studies
 Department of Political Science
 Department of Urdu Literature

Faculty of Biological Sciences 
 Department of Botany
 Department of Zoology

Faculty of Physical Sciences 
 Department of Chemistry
 Department of Computer Science
 Department of Mathematics
 Department of Statistics
 Department of Physics

Programs 
The college currently offers the following programs.

BS Degrees (4 years) 
 BS Physics
 BS Chemistry
 BS Political Science
 BS mathematics 
 BS Botany
 BS zoology

Master Degrees (2 years) 
 MA Islamiyat
 MSc Statistics
 MSc Computer Science

Intermediate 
 FSc – Pre-Medical (2 years)
 FSc – Pre-Engineering (2 years)
 FSc – Computer Science (2 years)
 FA – General Science (2 years)
 FA – Humanities (2 years)

See also  
 University of Lakki Marwat
 University of Science and Technology Bannu
 Khushal Khan Khattak University
 Government Post Graduate College Karak
 Government Post Graduate College Bannu

External links 
 Government Post Graduate College Lakki Marwat Official Website

References 

Public universities and colleges in Khyber Pakhtunkhwa
Lakki Marwat District